Jiří Valík (born 26 July 1966 in Zábřeh) is a retired Czech athlete who specialised in the sprinting events. He is best known for winning the bronze medal in the 60 metres at the 1990 European Indoor Championships. In addition, he competed at two indoor and one outdoor World Championships.

Competition record

Personal bests
Outdoor
100 metres – 10.27 (+0.3 m/s Nitra 1992)
200 metres – 20.81 (+0.4 m/s Drama 1987)
Indoor
50 metres – 5.73 (Prague 1990) NR
60 metres – 6.63 (Glasgow 1990)
200 metres – 21.18 (Genoa 1992)

References

All-Athletics profile

1966 births
Living people
People from Zábřeh
Czechoslovak male sprinters
Czech male sprinters
World Athletics Championships athletes for the Czech Republic
Sportspeople from the Olomouc Region